During the 1997–98 English football season, Bristol Rovers F.C. competed in the Football League Second Division.

Season summary
The 1997–98 season saw Bristol Rovers reach the playoff places, finishing in 5th place and despite taking a first-leg advantage of 3–1 against Northampton Town, Rovers subsequently lost 3–0 in the second leg and went out 4–3 on aggregate in the semi-finals.

Final league table

Results
Bristol Rovers' score comes first

Legend

Football League Second Division

Second Division play-offs

FA Cup

League Cup

Football League Trophy

Squad

Transfers

In

Out

Transfers in:  £400,000
Transfers out:  £30,000
Total spending:  £370,000

References

Bristol Rovers F.C. seasons
Bristol Rovers